The 2010–11 Alabama–Huntsville Chargers ice hockey team represented the University of Alabama in Huntsville in the 2010–11 NCAA Division I men's ice hockey season. The Chargers were coached by Chris Luongo who was in his first season as head coach. His assistant coaches were Mike Warde and Gavin Morgan. The Chargers played their home games in the Propst Arena at the Von Braun Center, competed as an independent and finished with an overall record of 4–26–2.

Preseason
Following the 2009–10 season, the Chargers' conference, College Hockey America, dropped their men's division after Bemidji State, Niagara, and Robert Morris left for other conferences.  UAH applied for admission to the Central Collegiate Hockey Association, but were denied, forcing the Chargers to play the 2010–11 season as an independent.

Coaching changes
On May 19, 2010, assistant coach John McCabe was named the head coach at Division III Finlandia University, ending a six-year tenure at UAH.  On June 21, 2010, head coach Danton Cole was announced as the U.S. National Team Development Program’s Under-17 head coach.  Remaining assistant coach Chris Luongo was named head coach on July 9. Assistant coach Mike Warde was announced on August 20, and Gavin Morgan was announced on August 27.

Roster
As of September 4, 2010

|}

Regular season

Schedule
  Green background indicates win.
  Red background indicates loss.
  Yellow background indicates tie.

Opponents by conference

Player stats
As of February 12, 2011

Skaters

Goaltenders

References

Alabama–Huntsville Chargers men's ice hockey seasons
Alabama-Huntsville